James Parker, CH (1863 – 11 February 1948) was a British Labour Party politician.

He was elected as Member of Parliament (MP) for Halifax at the 1906 general election, and held the seat until the town's representation was reduced to one seat at the 1918 general election. He did not stand again in Halifax, but instead stood in the Cannock division of Staffordshire, as a Coalition Labour candidate (i.e. a holder of the coalition coupon, supporting the Lloyd George's coalition government). He won the seat, but lost it, standing as a National Liberal at the 1922 general election.
Parker was made a Companion of Honour by King George V in 1918.

References

External links 
 

1863 births
1948 deaths
Independent Labour Party National Administrative Committee members
Labour Party (UK) MPs for English constituencies
UK MPs 1906–1910
UK MPs 1910
UK MPs 1910–1918
UK MPs 1918–1922
Coalition Labour MPs
National Liberal Party (UK, 1922) politicians